The Saint-Robert-Bellarmin Wind Project is a wind farm in the municipality of Saint-Robert-Bellarmin, Quebec in Canada. It has been in commercial operation since October 16, 2012. It has 40 wind turbines, each of 2 MW power, for a total capacity of 80 MW. It delivers energy to Hydro-Québec.

The wind project was developed and is owned by EDF EN Canada Inc. It is operated and maintained by REpower Systems Inc. and EDF Renewable Services Inc.

See also

List of wind farms in Canada

References

Buildings and structures in Gaspésie–Îles-de-la-Madeleine
Wind farms in Quebec